Rafał Wolski (born 10 November 1992 in Kozienice) is a Polish professional footballer who plays as a midfielder for Polish Ekstraklasa side Wisła Płock.

Career
On 2 May 2012, Wolski was named by Franciszek Smuda in the provisional squad of 26 players for the Euro 2012 tournament, being the only uncapped footballer (at the time) to make the list. On 22 May 2012, he made his debut for the senior side of his country in the 1–0 win over Latvia in a friendly match.

He was an unused substitute for Fiorentina in the 2014 Coppa Italia Final, which they lost 3–1 to Napoli.

On 24 February 2016 he was loaned to Polish Ekstraklasa side Wisła Kraków.

From 2016 until 2020 Wolski played for Lechia Gdańsk.

Career statistics

Club

International

International goals
Score and Result lists Poland's goals first

Honours
Legia Warsaw
 Polish Cup: 2010–11, 2011–12

Lechia Gdańsk
 Polish Cup: 2018–19
 Polish Super Cup: 2019

Individual
 Ekstraklasa Player of the Month: July 2022

References

External links
 
 

1992 births
Living people
People from Kozienice
Polish footballers
Polish expatriate footballers
Poland international footballers
Poland youth international footballers
Poland under-21 international footballers
Association football midfielders
UEFA Euro 2012 players
Ekstraklasa players
Serie A players
Serie B players
Belgian Pro League players
Legia Warsaw players
ACF Fiorentina players
S.S.C. Bari players
K.V. Mechelen players
Wisła Kraków players
Lechia Gdańsk players
Wisła Płock players
Expatriate footballers in Italy
Expatriate footballers in Belgium
Polish expatriate sportspeople in Italy
Polish expatriate sportspeople in Belgium
Sportspeople from Masovian Voivodeship